Little Fish may refer to:

Arts and entertainment
Little Fish (2005 film), an Australian film directed by Rowan Woods
Little Fish (2021 film), an American film directed by Chad Hartigan
Little Fish (band), a British garage rock band
Little Fish (musical), a 2003 musical by Michael John LaChiusa
"Little Fishes", a 1975 song by Brian Eno from Another Green World
Little Fish (novel), a 2018 novel by Casey Plett
 Little Fish, a character on Bubble Guppies

Places
Little Fish Bay or Baía de Namibe, Angola
Little Fish Lake, Alberta, Canada
Little Fish Lake Provincial Park
Little Fish River, a tributary of the Great Fish River in South Africa

Other uses
Benny Bass (1904–1975), nicknamed Little Fish, American boxer
Rybička (knife) or Little Fish, a Czech pocketknife